John Melville West (17 February 1889 – 30 March 1960) was an Australian rules footballer who played with Melbourne and University in the Victorian Football League (VFL).

Military service
He was both a footballer and a resident master at Melbourne Grammar School when he enlisted in the AIF, 7th Battalion, C Company, on 17 August 1914, only two weeks after war was declared.

On 25 April 1915 he landed at Gallipoli and four days later was appointed second lieutenant. In August he was promoted to lieutenant, just a week before he was wounded in action with significant gunshot wounds to the head and hand. A few days later he was admitted to the 1st Australian General Hospital, Cairo, Egypt, and he subsequently returned to Australia in May 1916 as he was no longer fit for active duties. From 1919 until 1947 he was employed by Munitions Supply Department.

Death
West died in Melbourne on 30 March 1960, aged 71.

Footnotes

References
 Holmesby, Russell & Main, Jim (2007). The Encyclopedia of AFL Footballers. 7th ed. Melbourne: Bas Publishing.

External links
 

1889 births
Australian rules footballers from Victoria (Australia)
University Football Club players
Melbourne Football Club players
1960 deaths
People from Mooroopna